Courtship is the period of development towards an intimate relationship.

Courtship may also refer to:

Film and TV
Courtship (film), a 1987 American drama film
Courtship, 1961 French documentary with Geneviève Bujold
Courtship (Persian: Khastegari), 1989 Iranian film with Soraya Ghasemi 
Courtship, play by Horton Foote

Music
"Courtship", song by Bob James
"Courtship", song by American noise rock band Health from Health 2007
"Courtship", song by Björk from Utopia
"Courtship", track by Thomas Newman from He Named Me Malala soundtrack